The Sauk or Sac are a group of Native Americans of the Eastern Woodlands culture group, who lived primarily in the region of what is now Green Bay, Wisconsin, when first encountered by the French in 1667. Their autonym is oθaakiiwaki, and their exonym is Ozaagii(-wag) in Ojibwe. The latter name was transliterated into French and English by colonists of those cultures. Today they have three federally recognized tribes, together with the Meskwaki (Fox), located in Iowa, Oklahoma and Kansas.

History

Early history 

The Sauk, an Algonquian languages people, are believed to have developed as a people along the St. Lawrence River, which is now northern New York. The precise time is unknown, but around the time of the year 1600, they were driven from the area of the St. Lawrence river. Some historians believe that the Sauk migrated to what is now eastern Michigan, where they settled around Saginaw Bay (Ojibwe: Zaagiinaad-wiikwed – "Of the Outlet Bay"). For many years, the Sauk are believed to have prospered in the fertile valley of Saginaw thereafter. They had been driven west by pressure from other tribes, especially the powerful Iroquois League or Haudenosaunee, which sought control over hunting grounds in the area.  

The neighboring Anishanabeg Ojibwe (Sauk name: Ochipwêwa) and Odawa peoples referred to them by the exonym Ozaagii(-wag), meaning "those at the outlet". French colonists transliterated that as Sac and the English as "Sauk". The Sauk/Sac called themselves the 
autonym of Othâkîwa, Thâkîwa, Thâkîwaki or Asaki-waki/Oθaakiiwaki people of the yellow earth [("people coming forth [from the outlet]," i.e., "from the water")], which is often interpreted to mean "yellow-earth people" or "the Yellow-Earths", due to the yellow-clay soils found around Saginaw Bay. This was later shortened to "Asaki-waki". In addition, the Fox (Meskwaki) were generally known among neighboring tribes as the "people of the red earth" - the Sauk and Fox also used this term: Êshkwîha or Meshkwahkîha ("people of the red earth").

Some Ojibwe oral histories also place the Sauk in the Saginaw Valley some time before the arrival of Europeans. Sauk traditions state that the tribe occupied the vicinity of Saginaw river. (In this tradition, the name 'Saginaw' comes from the Ojibwe "O-Sauk-e-non," meaning "land of the Sauks" or "where the Sauks were.") Approximately from the years 1638 to 1640, it is believed that a fierce battle ensued, nearly annihilating the entire Sauk Tribe. According to the legend, the Ojibwe inhabited the lands north of the Saginaw Bay, and the harsher northern climate caused more difficulty in prosperity compared to that of the Sauk occupying the area of Saginaw Valley. The Ojibwe allied with the Ottawa, who resided south of the Sauk, and sprung a series of attacks on the Sauk, which practically decimated their people. One such attack, the Battle of Skull Island, occurred on an island in the Saginaw river, which became afterwards known as Skull Island. (Its name came from the many skulls and bones supposedly found in mounds on that island over the years.)  In this battle, it is said that the Sauk had used their boats to cross part of the river, escape to the island, and were temporarily free from their attackers. But when morning came, ice had solidified the river enough for the Ojibwe to cross. They killed every member of the Sauk tribe who had fled to that island besides twelve women whom they later sent west of the Mississippi River.

But later Europeans may have mistakenly recorded the Sauk as once dwelling at this location near Lake Huron. There is little archaeological evidence that the Sauk lived in the Saginaw area. In the early 17th century, when natives told French explorer Samuel de Champlain that the Sauk nation was located on the west shore of Lake Michigan, Champlain mistakenly placed them on the western shore of Lake Huron. This mistake was copied on subsequent maps, and future references identified this as the place of the Sauk. Champlain never visited what is now Michigan.

Anishinaabe expansion and the Huron attempting to gain regional stability drove the Sac out of their territory. The Huron were armed with guns supplied by their French trading partners. The Sac moved south to territory in parts of what are now northern Illinois and Wisconsin. In the seventeenth century the Sauk also maintained close relations with the Potawatomi (Pehkînenîha or Shîshîpêhinenîha). This relation has been found by borrowings of Sauk vocabulary that appear in the Potawatomi language.

In a loose coalition of tribes – including Dakota (Ashâha), Ojibwe, Odawa, Potawatomi, Kickapoo (Kîkâpôwa), Meskwaki (Fox), and Sauk, along with the Shawnee (Shâwanôwa), Cherokee (Shanahkîha), and Choctaw (Châkitâha) from the Southeast – they attacked the tribes of the Illinois Confederation ("Illinois/Inoca") (Mashkotêwa) and tried to invade their tribal areas. The "Illinois/Inoca" became their worst common enemies. The coalition warred for years until they destroyed the Illinois Confederation.

Later they moved out on the prairie (Mashkotêwi) along the Mississippi and adopted the semi-sedentary lifestyle of Plains Indians (Mashkotêwineniwa). In addition to hunting buffalo, they lived in villages, raised crops, and actively traded with other tribes. The Sauk and allied eastern tribes had to compete with tribes who already occupied this territory. Disputes and clashes arose with the Dakota, Pawnee (Pânîha) and, most of all, the powerful Osage (Washâsha).

The Sauk had good relations with the English (Thâkanâsha) through trading. At first, the Sauk had good relations with New France too, until their alliance with the Meskwaki (Fox) made them short-term enemies of the French (Mêmehtekôshîha, Wêmehtekôshîha).

A closely allied tribe, the Meskwaki (Fox), were noted for resisting French encroachment, having fought two wars against them in the early 18th century. After a devastating battle of 9 September 1730, in Illinois, in which hundreds of warriors were killed and many women and children taken captive by French allies, Fox refugees took shelter with the Sac. This made them subject to French attack in turn.  The Sac continued moving west to Iowa and Kansas. Keokuk and Black Hawk were two important leaders who arose among the Sauk. At first Keokuk accepted the loss of land as inevitable in the face of the vast numbers of white soldiers and settlers coming west. He tried to preserve tribal land and his people, and to keep the peace.

Having failed to receive expected supplies from the Americans on credit, Black Hawk wanted to fight, saying his people were "forced into war by being deceived". Led by Black Hawk in 1832, the mainly Sac band resisted the continued loss of lands (in western Illinois, this time.) Their warfare with United States forces resulted in defeat at the hands of General Edmund P. Gaines in the Black Hawk War.

Oklahoma history 

About this time, one group of Sac moved into Missouri, and later to Kansas and Nebraska. In 1869, after the Civil War, the United States forced the larger group of Sac to move into a reservation in Indian Territory (now the state of Oklahoma). They merged with the Meskwaki as the federally recognized Sac and Fox Nation. (The United States had been making treaties with the two tribes together since their residency in the Midwest.) A smaller number returned to the Midwest from Oklahoma (or resisted leaving.) They joined the Mesquakie at the Mesqwaki Settlement, Iowa.

The land currently occupied by the Sauk is only a section of what used to be the Sac and Fox Reservation during the time of 1867–1891. This reservation was established by the U.S. and spanned 480,000 acres. In 1887, however, the Dawes Act failed to recognize Native American culture by dividing the reservation into small allotments designated for individual households. 
The remainder of land not allotted to the Sac and Fox was then sold to non-Native settlers in an attempt to gain Oklahoma statehood and the full assimilation of its Native American population.
By 1889, 519 of the tribe were located in Indian Territory, what is now central Oklahoma. On June 10, 1890, they ceded these Indian Territory lands to the federal government.

Treaties with U.S. 

Many of the latter treaties listed have little to no information regarding their details, besides the date. In total, twenty two treaties were signed from 1789 to, more than a century later, 1891.

 Treaty of Fort Harmar
 Treaty of Greenville
 Treaty of St. Louis (1804)
 Treaty of Portage des Sioux
 Treaty of St. Louis (1816)
 Treaty of St. Louis (1822)
 Treaty of Washington
 First Treaty of Prairie du Chien
 Fourth Treaty of Prairie du Chien
 1832 Treaty
 September 27, 1836 Treaty
 September 28, 1836 Treaty
 September 28, 1836 Treaty
 1837 Treaty
 1837 Treaty
 1842 Treaty
 1854 Treaty (Missouri Sac and Fox)
 1859 Treaty
 1861 Treaty (Iowa Sac and Fox)
 Feb 18th, 1867
 June 10, 1872 "Act of Congress" (Missouri Sac and Fox)
 Feb 13th, 1891 "Act of Congress"

Clan system
The Sauk and Fox peoples were divided into two moieties or "divisions", which in turn were subdivided into Patri-lineages and Clans as local subgroups (segments).

The moieties were known as the Kishko/Ki-sko-ha/Kîshkôha (male: Kîshkôha, female: Kîshkôhkwêha) ("the long-haired") and as the Oskush/Askasa/Shkasha (male: Shkasha/Oshkashîwiwa, female: Shkashîhkwêwa/Oshkashîhkwêwiwa) ("the brave"). The two moieties were each symbolized by two colors: The Askasa/Shkasha painted their faces and partly their bodies with charcoal in mahkatêwâwi (black) and the Ki-sko-ha/Kîshkôha painted their bodies with white clay in wâpeshkyâwi (white). This duality was also celebrated by the two moieties in Lacrosse, which was often played extremely brutally to toughen young warriors for combat, for recreation, as part of festivals, and used as preparation for imminent wars or raids.

This division has survived to the present day, but is now more related to the political system of the United States: the supporters of the Democratic Party are associated with the Kîshkôha/Kîshkôhkwêha, while the supporters of the Republican Party are associated with the Shkasha/Shkashîhkwêwa.

Originally, the Sauk had a patrilineal and exogamous clan system, in which descent and inheritance was traced through the father. Clans or Mîthonî distinguished and named on the basis of totem animals, which are: Mahkwithowa (Bear Clan), Amehkwithowa (Beaver Clan), Peshekethiwithowa (Deer Clan), Ketiwithowa / Mekethiwithowa (Eagle Clan), Nemêthithowa (Fish Clan), Wâkoshêhithowa (Fox Clan), Kehchikamîwithowa (Ocean/Sea/Great Lake Clan), Keshêhokimâwithowa (Peace Clan), Ahpenîthowa (Potato Clan), Akônithowa (Snow Clan), Nenemehkiwithowa (Thunder Clan), Manethenôkimâwithowa (Warrior Clan), and Mahwêwithowa (Wolf Clan).

Saukenuk or Saukietown (today: Black Hawk State Historic Site) near the mouth of the Rock River (Sinnissippi – "rocky waters") into the Mississippi (Mäse'sibowi – "great river"), the most important Sauk settlement in the 18th and 19th centuries with about 4,000 inhabitants, was divided into 12 districts, which were assigned to the respective clans.

The tribe was governed by a council of sacred clan chiefs, a war chief, the head of families, and the warriors. Chiefs were recognized in three categories: civil, war, and ceremonial. Only the civil chiefs were hereditary. The other two chiefs were recognized by bands after they demonstrated their ability or spiritual power.

This traditional manner of selecting historic clan chiefs and governance was replaced in the 19th century by the United States appointing leaders through their agents at the Sac and Fox Agency, or reservation in Indian Territory (now Oklahoma). In the 20th century, the tribe adopted a constitutional government patterned after the United States form. They elect their chiefs.

Federally recognized tribes
Today the federally recognized Sac and Fox tribes are:
Sac and Fox Nation (meaning: "People of the yellow earth"), headquartered in Stroud, Oklahoma;
Sac and Fox Tribe of the Mississippi in Iowa (meaning: "People of the red earth"), headquartered in Tama, Iowa; and
Sac and Fox Nation of Missouri in Kansas and Nebraska, headquartered in Reserve, Kansas.

Language

Sauk is a dialect of the Fox language, one of the many Algonquian languages. It is very closely related to the dialects spoken by the Meskwaki and the Kickapoo tribes. Each of the dialects contains archaisms and innovations that distinguish them from each other. Sauk and Meskwaki appear to be the most closely related of the three, reflecting the peoples' long relationship. Sauk is considered to be mutually intelligible, to a point, with Fox.

In their own language, the Sauk at one time called themselves asakiwaki [a-'sak-i-wa-ki], "people of the outlet". The Sauk people have a syllabic orthography for their language. They published a Primer Book in 1975, based on a "traditional" syllabary that existed in 1906. It is intended to help modern-day Sauk to learn to write and speak their ancestral tongue. A newer orthography was proposed around 1994 to aid in language revival. The former syllabary was aimed at remaining native speakers of Sauk; the more recent orthography was developed for native English speakers, as many Sauk grow up with English as their first language

Sauk has so few speakers that it is considered an endangered language, as are numerous others native to North America.

In 2005, A Concise Dictionary of the Sauk Language was published using the Algonquianist Standard Roman Orthography.

In 2012, Shawnee High School in Shawnee, Oklahoma, began to offer a Sauk language course.

Sauk language loss 

Use of Sauk as the official tribal language in everyday communication declined rapidly between 1935 and 1945. The chances of coming across a tribal member who can understand basic phrases of Sauk is small, due to the fact that the main language spoken by the Sac and Fox today is English. The loss of Sauk, as with many other Native American languages, lies in context with American history. Speaking in the native language was actively discouraged and often punished in Indian boarding schools during the late 19th and early 20th century, when the U.S. was attempting to assimilate Native Americans into European-American culture.

Another conflict for the preservation of the language, is that the original syllabary created was intended for the use of native Sauk speakers, and its clarification was designed from the Sauk language. This is a problem because this is no longer as helpful for the majority of the Sac and Fox nation, as the official tribe language today is English. The issue arises in instances when Sauk is being taught to a school in the tribe, and an elder, who is fluent in the language, disagrees with the pronunciation being taught.

Phonology
Sauk does not have many phonemes in comparison to many other languages: four vowels, two semivowels, and nine consonants.

Consonants

The following consonant phonemes are given in Reinschmidt (1995):

It was added back in later editions because it is an important distinctive sound in the Sauk language.

Reinschmidt symbolizes  as /y/, following Americanist practice.

All four stops have at least two allophones each, one fortis and one lenis:
 → 

 → 

 → 

 → 

Reinschmidt symbolizes  as /y/, following Americanist practice.

Vowels

Vowel length is important in the Sauk language because of its distinctive function. Long vowels are often distinguished by the doubling of characters, such as a / aa representing two different spoken lengths. This is different for the vowel e, as an elongated version of this vowel shares the sound of the vowel in the English word bear. Reinschmidt presents four vowels, each with two allophones:

 → 

 → 

 → 

 →

Pitch and tone
Pitch and tone are important when speaking Sauk, as there is a general rule of emphasizing the first or second syllable of phrases, and slowly fades away by the end of a word. The Sauk language is perceived as having a "swallowed" quality when referring to the ends of phrases and words, so pitch, tone and intonation is a concept that would come from learning the language as opposed to studying the syllabary.

Syllables
Both the Sauk and Fox languages are known for "swallowing" syllables in word-final position, which can make identification of individual sounds more difficult for the language learner.

Morphology
Sauk is a polysynthetic language. Because this can easily pose great difficulties to learners with little to no experience with highly synthetic languages, the Sauk orthography has words written by identifying each syllable.

Orthography
Two samples of written Sauk language, as they appear in:

Ho!  Ne nu ta ma!

'Hi!  I speak Sauk!'

Ni swi me cli ke a ki a la se te ke wa ki a la te ki ki

e ka ta wi ke mi yak i e we li ke mi ya ki ne ko ti

me cle ke a e cla gwe ne mo tti wi ne li wi tti cle we na

li ta ske wa ne li se ke

"Two turtles were sunning on a bank when a thunderstorm approached.  When it began to rain, one turtle said to the other, 'I don't want to get wet,' and jumped into the lake."

Geographical names
Lake Osakis in west-central Minnesota, the Sauk River, which flows from Lake Osakis, and the towns of Osakis, Sauk Centre, and Sauk Rapids all were named for association historically with a small party of Sac who made camp on the shores of Lake Osakis. They had been banished from their tribe for murder. According to Anishinaabe oral tradition, these five Sac were killed by local Dakota in the late 18th century.

Place names with "Sauk" references include: 
Iowa: Sac City, Sac County, and Sac Township.
Illinois: Sauk Village; Sauk Valley: the cities of Dixon, Sterling, Rock Falls and the surrounding area; Sauk Trail, a winding road south of Chicago, said to follow an old Indian trail; Johnson-Sauk Trail State Recreation Area; and Black Hawk College [Moline and Kewanee, IL].
Michigan: The name of Saginaw is believed to mean "where the Sauk were" in Ojibwe; and the Saginaw Trail is said to follow an ancient Native American trail. US Route 12 in Michigan is said to follow the Sauk Native American trail.
Minnesota: City of Sauk Centre, Le Sauk and Little Sauk townships, Lake Osakis, Sauk River, Sauk Rapids.
Missouri: Sac Township, Sac River and Little Sac River of southwest Missouri
North Dakota: Sauk Prairie and Sauk Valley Township
Wisconsin: Prairie du Sac, Sauk City, Saukville, Sauk County and Ozaukee County

Notable people 
Black Hawk
Checokalako
Keokuk
Do-Hum-Me
Quashquame
Jim Thorpe

See also

African-Native Americans
Algonquian languages
Sac and Fox Nation
Kickapoo
Meskwaki
Native Americans in the United States
Native American tribes
Native American tribes in Nebraska
One Drop Rule
Saginaw Trail
Sauk Trail

Notes
1. The name of the Sauk River in Washington State, however, comes from the Sah-kee-ma-hu (Sauk-Suiattle tribe), a group related to the Skagit tribes, not from the Sac tribe of the Midwestern U.S.

References

External links
 Official Site of the Sac and Fox Tribe of the Mississippi in Iowa/Meskwaki Nation – the Meskwaki
 Official Site of the Sac and Fox Nation (of Oklahoma) – the Thakiwaki or Sa ki wa ki
 Official Site of the Sac and Fox Nation of Missouri in Kansas and Nebraska – the Ne ma ha ha ki
General information to Sac and Fox
Sauk Language, Sac and Fox Nation

 
Algonquian peoples
Native American tribes in Iowa
Native American tribes in Kansas
Native American tribes in Missouri
Native American tribes in Nebraska
Black Hawk War
Indigenous peoples of the Northeastern Woodlands
Algonquian ethnonyms
Native American tribes in Illinois
Native American tribes in Wisconsin
Native Americans in the American Revolution